The  was a rectangular or trapezoidal panel embroidered on the ceremonial mantle (chlamys) of courtiers during the Byzantine Empire.


The  were chosen to contrast with the mantle colour, and sewn pairwise on the front edges of the mantle. They could be further decorated with embroidered designs or images of the emperor. The emperor's mantle originally (in the 4th century) featured  sewn almost at the bottom of the mantle, below the knees, but from the 6th century they were moved to the centre of the mantle opening. The exact significance of this is unclear, although it has been suggested that it might denote lower court ranks.

In the Kletorologion of 899, the term  is also used for a box for the emperor's personal garments, carried by his servants during processions.

See also 
 Mandarin square
 Tiraz

References

Sources 

 
 

Byzantine clothing